North Gyeongsang Province (Gyeongsangbuk-do) is divided into 10 cities (si) and 13 counties (gun). Listed below is each entity's name in English, hangul and hanja.

Cities

Counties

List by Population and Area

General information

See also 

 List of cities in South Korea

North Gyeongsang